Ilaria is an extinct genus of marsupial of the family Ilariidae, dating from the Late Oligocene of South Australia. Its diet consisted of leaves.

References 

 Archer, M.; Flannery, T.; Hand, S.; Long, J. Prehistoric Mammals of Australia and New Guinea: One Hundred Million Years of Evolution. UNSW Press, 2002. 244 pages.

Prehistoric vombatiforms
Prehistoric mammals of Australia
Oligocene marsupials
Prehistoric marsupial genera